Tim Robinson (born May 23, 1981) is an American comedian, actor, writer, and producer. Robinson first became known as a writer and performer on the NBC sketch comedy series Saturday Night Live from 2012 to 2014, before gaining wider recognition as the co-creator, co-writer, and star of the comedy series Detroiters (2017–2018) and I Think You Should Leave with Tim Robinson (2019–present).

Early life
Robinson was born in Detroit on May 23, 1981, the son of a mother who worked for Chrysler and a father who worked in construction. His parents divorced, after which he said he "kind of grew up with two dads", one of whom was Jewish and celebrated Hanukkah with him. He was raised in the nearby towns of Clarkston and Waterford, graduating from Clarkston High School in 2000. He saw a live Second City comedy performance in Chicago as a teenager, and soon began taking weekend improv classes at its Detroit branch. While pursuing a comedy career, he supported himself with jobs such as working in a toy store and teaching improv classes.

Career 
Robinson toured with Second City Detroit's touring company, then joined Second City Chicago. He has also performed at the iO Theater and Just for Laughs. He filmed a 2011 television pilot for Comedy Central called My Mans, but the show was not picked up by the network. In 2012, he was cast as a series regular in the unaired CBS sitcom Friend Me. In September 2012, he made his debut as a featured performer on Saturday Night Live. A year later, it was announced that he would work on the writing staff rather than continue being a performer, making him the second SNL cast member (after Brian Doyle-Murray) to go from performer to staff writer and the first SNL performer to become a writer after originally being cast solely as a performer. His celebrity impressions on the show included Ben Bailey and Bill Cowher, and he also portrayed the reoccurring character Carl, an elderly retail worker who would always get insulted by Niff (Bobby Moynihan) and Dana (Cecily Strong).

Robinson has appeared twice on late-night NBC talk show Late Night with Seth Meyers as Dale, who acts as host Seth Meyers' "emergency sidekick." His first appearance was during the "Next Week's News" sketch on February 28, 2014, and his second appearance was during the "Celebrity Drunk Texts" sketch on April 8, 2014. In 2016, he wrote and appeared in his own episode of the sketch comedy show Netflix Presents: The Characters. He is also the co-creator and co-star of Detroiters, along with fellow Detroit native and frequent collaborator Sam Richardson. The show premiered on Comedy Central in February 2017. In April 2017, he guest starred on Fox's Making History as Al Capone.

In 2018, Netflix green-lit I Think You Should Leave with Tim Robinson, a sketch comedy series created by and starring Robinson and produced by the members of The Lonely Island. It premiered in April 2019 and received critical acclaim, as did its second season, which premiered in July 2021. 

In 2022, Robinson won the Primetime Emmy Award for Outstanding Actor in a Short Form Comedy or Drama Series for his work on I Think You Should Leave.

Personal life 
As a teenager, Robinson began dating his schoolmate Heather, who later became an electrical engineer for Chrysler. The two were married in September 2006, and live in Los Angeles with their son and daughter.

Having become an avid skateboarder during high school, Robinson continues to skateboard in his spare time.

Filmography

Film

Television

References

External links
 
 

1981 births
Living people
American male comedians
American male television actors
American television writers
American male television writers
Male actors from Detroit
People from Clarkston, Michigan
21st-century American male actors
American impressionists (entertainers)
American sketch comedians
Screenwriters from Michigan
21st-century American comedians
21st-century American screenwriters
21st-century American male writers
Primetime Emmy Award winners